The Wapiti River is a river in the Southland Region of New Zealand. It rises in the northern extremity of the Stuart Mountains in Fiordland National Park, the top of its watershed being part of the main divide. Two branches feed Lake Sutherland, (elevation ) the outflow of which flows southwest to Lake Thomson. A further  reach of the river heads east to Lake Hankinson, which is separated from the North West Arm of the Middle Fiord of Lake Te Anau by a final  stretch of the river.

The river is named for the Wapiti (Cervus canadensis), an introduced deer species found in Fiordland. Lake Wapiti lies a few kilometres from the Wapiti River, but is in a separate catchment, that of the Doon River feeding the West Arm of the Middle Fiord.
A tramping track connecting Lake Te Anau to George Sound via the Henry Pass follows the Wapiti River from its mouth as far as the head of Lake Thomson, thereafter turning west up a tributary named Rugged Burn.

References

Rivers of Fiordland